The Indonesian Dangdut Awards are annual Indonesian awards that are presented by Indosiar television station, which recognize popularity in the music industry dangdut genre. The annual show was first held on June 11, 2014. The annual presentation ceremony features performances by prominent artists, and the presentation of those awards that have a more popular interest.

Ceremonies 
The inaugural ceremony in 2014 was held at the Teater Tanah Airku, Taman Mini Indonesia Indah on the East Jakarta. In 2015, the Studio 5 Indosiar in West Jakarta hosted the awards. The ceremony was moved to the Studio 6 Emtek City at West Jakarta Live in 2016.

History 
This award was created the first time by Indosiar because of the success of the program D'Academy is a talent search dangdut song competition. The show also has successfully published a best dangdut singer. Finally, in 2014, Indosiar created the program Indonesian Dangdut Awards, the first night, judges and the graduated from talent search competition to enliven the event, and other top dangdut singer. The event is made, to appreciate the talented Indonesian dangdut singer. On the eve of the celebration, Rina Nose, Ramzi, Irfan Hakim, and Ivan Gunawan served as host.

Award process 
The nominees and award winners are selected based selection of the most popular viewers via SMS. While the election has its own special award from the organizers. All awards through the verification team Indosiar and music observers. For a special award will be chosen by the judges.

Categories 
From 2014 to 2016, the show had the same categories and category names every year. In 2014, totaling 8 categories, each winner will get one trophy. There is also one special nominations, namely "Dangdut Share" given to 5 dangdut musicians. In 2015, the category increased to 11 and in 2016 became 10.

Current categories 
The most important categories are Dangdut Singer Male Solo Popular, Dangdut Singer Female Solo Popular, Group/Duo Dangdut Popular and Dangdut Song Popular. These categories highlighted in each award.
 Dangdut Singer Male Solo Most Popular
 Dangdut Singer Female Solo Most Popular
 New Arrivals Male Most Popular
 New Arrivals Female Most Popular
 Group/Duo Dangdut Most Popular
 Dangdut Song Most Popular
 Best Costume Dangdut Appearance
 Special Award for Songwriters
 Dangdut singer Social Media Darling

Retired categories 
 Video Clips Dangdut Most Popular (in 2015)
 Dangdut Songwriters Popular (in 2014 to 2015)
 Dangdut Shake Most Popular (in 2014)
 Local Language Dangdut Songs Most Popular  (in 2014)

Special awards

Dangdut Share 
 2014: Mara Karma
 2014: Ellya Khadam
 2014: Munif Bahasuan
 2014: Denny Albar
 2014: Ida Laila

Lifetime Achievement Award 
 2015: Mara Karma
 2016: Rita Sugiarto

Multiple wins and nominations 
Most Wins 

Most Nominations

Ratings

See also

 List of Asian television awards
 Music of Indonesia

External links

References 

Indonesian music awards
Awards established in 2014
Annual television shows
Indosiar